K. A. Gamage (died 20 April 2009), was a Major in the Sri Lanka Army who posthumously received the Parama Weera Vibhushanaya, Sri Lanka's highest military award for gallantry. At the time of his death, he was serving in the army's elite Special Forces Regiment. Before joining the Special Forces, Gamage had also served in the Vijayabahu Infantry Regiment.

Actions on April 2009 
By mid-April 2009, the Sri Lankan Civil War was in its final stages, with the army's northern offensive confining remnants of the Liberation Tigers of Tamil Eelam (commonly known as LTTE or Tamil Tigers) to an approximately  area near the Nanthikadal lagoon, which had earlier been declared by the government as a no-fire-zone for civilians.

The 1st Battalion of the Special Forces Regiment was tasked with destroying the bund and facilitating the civilians' escape into government-held territory, and the operation was launched on the night of 19 April 2009 from the Ampalavanpokkanai area. Gamage led one of the contingents for this operation, with orders to capture a section of the bund and cover the civilians' escape but not to advance forward of the bund itself. Gamage and his unit managed to cross the lagoon and reach the bund under the cover of darkness without being detected, and assaulted the Tamil Tiger bunkers along it. They successfully captured a section of the bund, starting a mass exodus of civilians into the government-held areas through it. 

However, they soon came under heavy fire from Tamil Tiger positions within the no-fire-zone. In order to protect the civilians and his unit from the fire, Gamage chose to ignore his orders and repeatedly led attacks against these positions into the no-fire-zone. He fought through the night and into the morning of 20 April, until he was killed by LTTE fire. More than 25,000 civilians had reached the government-held areas on 20 April after the bund was captured. The rest of the civilians were evacuated in the days that followed, allowing the military to launch their final assault against the Tamil Tigers and eliminate their leaders. The government officially declared victory and the end of the war a month later on 19 May 2009.

Parama Weera Vibhushanaya 
Gamage was nominated by General Sarath Fonseka for the Parama Weera Vibhushanaya, Sri Lanka's highest military award for gallantry, for his actions on 19 and 20 April 2009. Three years later on 16 May 2012, it was announced in The Sri Lanka Gazette by Defence Secretary Gotabhaya Rajapaksa that Gamage will be posthumously awarded the medal along with 14 others. The citation for his award states:

Gamage's Parama Weera Vibhushanaya was presented to his next-of-kin at the Victory-Day celebrations on 19 May 2012 by Mahinda Rajapaksa, the President of Sri Lanka. He was the fifth and last member of the Special Forces to receive the award.

References 

Recipients of the Parama Weera Vibhushanaya
Vijayabahu Infantry Regiment officers
Special Forces Regiment officers
Year of birth missing
2009 deaths
Sri Lankan military personnel killed in action